The Pancha Rama Temples are five Hindu temples of Rama in Tiruvarur district, Tamil Nadu, India.

Location
All these temples are in Tiruvarur district. Pancha means five. They are located in Mudikondan, Adambar, Parutthiyur, Tillaivilagam and Vaduvur. Likewise there are also Pancha Krishna Temples and Pancha Ranga Temples dedicated to Vishnu.

 Sri Kodhanda Ramar Temple, Mudikondan
 Sri Kodhanda Ramar Temple, Adambar
 Sri Ramar Temple, Paruthiyur    
 Sri Kodhanda Ramar Temple, Thillaivilagam
 Sri Kodhanda Ramar Temple, Vaduvur

References

Hindu temples in Tiruvarur district
Vishnu temples
Rama temples
Vaishnavism